Shelley is a crater on Mercury.  Its name was adopted by the IAU in 1979, after the English poet Percy Bysshe Shelley, who lived from 1792 to 1822.

Shelley is overlain by the slightly smaller and younger crater Delacroix, to the north.

References

Impact craters on Mercury